Ranveer Singh Saini is an Indian golfer for Special Olympics Bharat, and a recipient of the Bhim Award by the Government of Haryana.

Ranveer is first Indian junior champion in the GF Golf-level 2 alternate shot team play event at the Special Olympics World Summer Games 2015.

Achievements 

 Gold in Special Olympics World Games 2015 
 Bhim Award by the Government of Haryana

References

Indian male golfers
Amateur golfers
Living people
Year of birth missing (living people)